Joachim Grzega (born 9 September 1971) is a German linguist. He studied English and French at the Catholic University of Eichstätt-Ingolstadt, University of Utah in Salt Lake City, Paris-Sorbonne University and the University of Graz. He has taught since 1998 at the Catholic University of Eichstätt-Ingolstadt. Grzega obtained his doctorate in 2000 in Romance, English and German linguistics. He obtained his habilitation (i.e. post-doctoral degree) in 2004. Professor Grzega has held interim or guest professorships in Münster, Bayreuth, Erfurt, Freiburg, and Budapest.

His focus is on onomasiology, eurolinguistics, intercultural communication, teaching of English as a lingua franca, language teaching in general and the role of language and communication in the transfer of knowledge. He also developed the Basic Global English (BGE) system for English teaching. With Onomasiology Online (Onon), he created one of the first peer-reviewed free access German linguistics journals. His second journal is specially dedicated to the relatively young branch of eurolinguistics: Journal for EuroLinguistiX (Jelix). He is also involved in the field of university-level language teaching, particularly in the development and dissemination of the Learning by teaching model founded in the 1980s by Jean-Pol Martin.

Works

References

External links
 Joachim Grzega Official website

1971 births
Living people
Linguists from Germany
Academic journal editors
Academic staff of the Catholic University of Eichstätt-Ingolstadt